{{safesubst:#invoke:RfD|||month = March
|day =  3
|year = 2023
|time = 01:11
|timestamp = 20230303011150

|content=
REDIRECT Chaos (genus)

}}